The 2010 Boston Red Sox season was the 110th season in the franchise's Major League Baseball history.   With a record of 89 wins and 73 losses, the Red Sox finished third in the American League East, seven games behind the Tampa Bay Rays, and failed to advance to the postseason for the first time since 2006.

The Red Sox opened and closed the season at Fenway Park against the New York Yankees—the last time the team had opened and closed a season at home against the Yankees was 1950.

Off season

November
On November 5, 2009, the day after the Red Sox-rival Yankees clinched their 27th title, Boston declared numerous players free agents. Among these free agents were: left-fielder Jason Bay, left-handed relief pitcher Billy Wagner, and productive bench-outfielder Rocco Baldelli. On the same day, Boston traded pitchers Hunter Jones and Jose Alvarez to the Florida Marlins for a young outfielder named Jeremy Hermida. Many questioned the move, since Hermida's career has been far below the speculated potential he was drafted in the 1st round (11th overall) in the 2002 Major League Baseball Draft. Contrary to popular opinion, Epstein supported Hermida saying, "We still think there's a good hitter in there ... Jeremy is a player who hasn't fulfilled his potential yet. We were able to acquire him at a reasonable cost to see if he can fulfill that potential with us."

Days later, on November 9, Boston resigned two key players in the 2009 campaign. Catcher/first baseman Victor Martínez, who was brought to Boston in a block-buster trade at the trade deadline from the Cleveland Indians for pitchers Justin Masterson, Nick Hagadone and Bryan Price, had a $7.1 million option picked up after hitting .336 with 8 HR and 41 RBI in 56 games during 2009. "We're going to really look for Victor to be an everyday catcher for us next year. We feel like that puts us in the best position to win with Victor catching as much as he can. The other spot we'll have available is for more of a traditional backup. We'll see what Tek's decision is before we move forward", Epstein told Boston reporters at the General Managers' Meeting in Chicago.

Boston also signed veteran knuckle-baller Tim Wakefield to a two-year deal worth $10 million. Before the All-Star break, Wakefield was tied for the American League lead in wins with 11 and was selected to his first All-Star game. (However, he did not pitch as part of the 2009 American League All-Star Manager Joe Maddon's decision.) Unfortunately, Wakefield did not get an opportunity to finish his season the same way as injuries kept him to just four starts after the All-Star Break. "He wants to end his career in a Red Sox uniform, which is something we would like to see as well. For us, the finances made a lot of sense", Epstein told reporters at the GM Meeting in Chicago on the same day. On the same day, Boston declined team options on C Jason Varitek and SS Álex González, only to have Varitek exercise his own $3 million option to remain with the Red Sox for the 14th straight season two days later, keeping his "captain" status.

December
Ever since the 2004 departure of former Red Sox star-shortstop Nomar Garciaparra at the trade deadline, the Red Sox have witnessed an array of shortstops brought in to stop the bleeding. On December 4, the Red Sox inked former Toronto Blue Jays SS Marco Scutaro to a two-year, $11 million contract, with a dual option for 2012 worth $6 million if the Red Sox pick it up, and $3 million if Scutaro picks it up. "We were looking to upgrade at shortstop. We were pretty clear about that going into the winter. Right from the start, we identified Marco as the best free agent and a guy who would be the best fit for this ballclub. It was a process of doing our due diligence and making sure we understood the whole landscape of the position through trades and free agency and then doing more due diligence on Marco", remarked Theo Epstein regarding the signing. Scutaro had a break-out season with Toronto in 2009, batting .282, scoring 100 runs, belting 12 homers, and producing a .379 OBP as the leadoff hitter.

On December 9, Boston made a move for the bettering of their bullpen, which had lost both Takashi Saito and Billy Wagner to free agency signings by the Atlanta Braves (who picked up both relievers), and acquired reliever Ramón A. Ramírez from the Tampa Bay Rays. Ramírez had pitched for the Cincinnati Reds from 2008–2009, compiling a 1–1 record with a 2.97 ERA, striking out 29 in 39.1 innings over the two seasons. The next day, Boston traded minor-league pitcher Chris Province to the Minnesota Twins for starter/reliever Boof Bonser. Bonser pitched for the Twins from 2006–2008 before undergoing season-ending right shoulder surgery in the spring of 2009, compiling an 18–25 record with a sub-par 5.12 ERA, striking out 317 in 391.2 innings and 60 starts.

The following week, on December 16, 2009, Boston made a double-headed offseason splash that eclipsed the Scutaro signing the previous month. Boston announced that they had come to terms with former Los Angeles Angels of Anaheim starter John Lackey and former Milwaukee Brewers center-fielder Mike Cameron.

Lackey was inked to a five-year pact worth a reported $82.5 million, sealing his future with the Sox through 2014. For his career, Lackey has a record of 102–71 with a 3.81 ERA (1201 K/1501.1 IP/1.31 WHIP). His best season was 2007, where he went 19–9 with a 3.01 and made the All-Star Team. He also finished 3rd in the Cy Young Award voting for the American League the same year. The addition of Lackey creates arguably the strongest "big three" atop any rotation in the Major Leagues. With aces Josh Beckett and Jon Lester already manning the 1–2 slam, Lackey provides the 3-hole punch that can likely compete with that of American League East division rival Yankees, consisting of ace CC Sabathia, former Blue Jay ace A. J. Burnett, and long-time Yankee playoff star Andy Pettitte.

Cameron was signed to a two-year deal worth between $15 and $16 million, signing him for the 2010 and 2011 seasons. Cameron has hit .250 with 265 HR, 926 RBI, .340 OBP, and a .448 SLUG% in his impressive 1,829 Major League career games. He has eclipsed 20 home runs in eight different seasons, while playing for the Chicago White Sox, Cincinnati Reds, Seattle Mariners, New York Mets, San Diego Padres and, of course, the Brewers.

On December 29, it was made official that Boston would not be bringing back left-field slugger Jason Bay as the New York Mets signed him to a four-year deal worth $66 million, which signs him from 2010–2013. There is also a fifth-year vesting option worth $17 million, with a $3 million buyout. The option becomes guaranteed if Bay reaches 600 plate appearances in 2013, or 500 plate appearances in both 2012 and 2013. The deal also includes a full no-trade clause, $8.5 million signing bonus, $6.5 million in 2010, and $16 million in each of the final three guaranteed seasons. In his only full season with the Red Sox, he notched a .267 average, hitting 36 HR and 119 RBI (both career highs) and earning the first Silver Slugger Award of his career.

January
To continue the impressive and economical 2009–10 offseason by the Boston front office, Theo Epstein added former Mariner and Los Angeles Dodger, third-baseman Adrián Beltré, to the Bay-less 2010 roster. Signing a one-year deal worth $9 million, with a $5 million player option for 2011, which would increase to $10 million if Beltre makes 640 plate appearances in 2010, the Red Sox bought themselves an additional half-season to determine the future of third-baseman Mike Lowell, the Red Sox hot-corner man since coming from the Florida Marlins club in 2006, along with starting ace Josh Beckett, in exchange for now super-star shortstop Hanley Ramírez. Beltre had a very down year with Seattle in 2009, hitting only .265 with 8 HR and 44 RBI in 111 games and 477 at-bats, a performance severely hindered by left shoulder woes. For his career, Beltre has hit .270 with 250 HR and 906 RBI.

Speculation arose, however, concerning the intellectuality of this move, as many had questioned Beltre's offensive capabilities, and those of the Red Sox themselves, stating that the loss of Jason Bay would hurt the club, who have won at least 95 games in all but one of Terry Francona's seasons as manager. In response to this, Theo Epstein stated, "I think Adrian's reputation is that he's one of best defenders in the game, period, let alone one of the best defensive third baseman. He's got all the attributes you look for in a third baseman. He's got quickness, he's got great hands. His feet are tremendous. Great arm and very quick release. He has that signature play coming in on balls, which he does better than maybe anyone in the history of the game. He attacks the baseball. He's really a weapon defensively, and we're looking forward to having him help our run prevention. But as Adrian said, he's not just  a defender. He has the ability to be a very well-rounded player and, in fact, a leader on the team. We look forward to having him help our club win in all phases of the game this year."

The Beltre signing occurred on January 8. One day prior, the Red Sox acquired another Mariner infielder/outfielder Bill Hall via trade in exchange for poorly-performing first-baseman/outfielder Casey Kotchman, filling a hole at first base for Seattle, who have declined to re-sign first-baseman slugger Russell Branyan. Boston will also receive an undisclosed Minor League player to be named later, and cash considerations. Hall will likely be used as a bench player who can give almost anyone a day off when necessary, and if Hall finds his form, Boston may even consider using him to make yet another blockbuster deal at the trade deadline this season, or even in the next offseason. The 30-year-old struggled immensely at the dish in 2009, hitting a microscopic .201 with 8 HR and 36 RBI in 334 at-bats. The Mariners are paying the better part of Hall's 2010 salary, and the rest is being sent to the Red Sox in the form of cash considerations.

During the last three weeks of January, Boston avoided arbitration hearings with five players by signing them to contracts, keeping alive Epstein's streak of never going to arbitration with any player during his tenure with the Red Sox.

On January 14, he first signed Japanese setup man Hideki Okajima to a one-year deal worth $2.75 million, with bonus clauses taking effect after 55 games, 60 games, 65 games and 70 games, each clause worth an additional $50,000. In his three-year career with Boston, the 34-year-old veteran is 12–4 with six saves, a 2.72 ERA, 192 IP, and 172 K, while showing remarkable consistency, making at least 60 appearances each season.

Just five days later, the Red Sox signed All-Star closer Jonathan Papelbon to a one-year, $9.35 million pact, a $3 million update from the $6.25 million he made in 2009. Papelbon, 29, has been to the Major League Baseball All-Star Game all four years he has been in the big leagues. He is Boston's all-time saves leader with 151, and his career is highlighted by stats like 268 appearances, 1.84 ERA, 346 K, 298 IP, .198 BAA, and a 10.45K/9 IP ratio. On this day, Boston also avoided arbitration with key relievers in Manny Delcarmen and Ramón S. Ramírez.

And, to top off Epstein's 8-year streak, the Red Sox signed Jeremy Hermida, whom the Sox acquired just a month earlier, to the tune of one-year and $3.345 million. The left-handed hitter is projected as a back-up to the Boston outfield, composed of Jacoby Ellsbury, Mike Cameron and J. D. Drew, but is happy nonetheless. The Red Sox are hoping he will live up to the expectations that the Marlins put on him when they picked him 11th overall in the 2002 draft.

Spring training
On February 10, 2010, fans gathered at Fenway Park to kick off the Red Sox preseason by celebrating Truck Day. The first full team workout of the preseason took place on February 24, 2010. Playing other teams in the Grapefruit League, the Red Sox had 17 wins, 14 losses, and 1 tie during spring training.

2010 season
General manager Theo Epstein set the tone for the regular season by characterizing  it as a "bridge year", referring to the next wave of key talent that will be ready to take the field in 2011 and 2012. For the 2010 season, Epstein brought in new additions: Marco Scutaro, Adrián Beltré, Mike Cameron and John Lackey.

Over the course of the season, 19 players spent 24 stints on the disabled list. Starter players Jacoby Ellsbury, Dustin Pedroia and Kevin Youkilis suffered season ending injuries. Due to the abundance of injuries, a number of players within the system emerged to have increased visibility on the team. Altogether, the Red Sox used 53 players in 2010, six of whom made their major league debut in 2010.

Opening Day

The Red Sox kicked off their 2010 regular season on April 4 at home against the New York Yankees. Trailing the Yankees for most of the game, the Sox began to make a comeback when Jorge Posada made two consecutive errors and Kevin Youkillis crossed home plate, pulling the Sox ahead. The final score was Red Sox 9, Yankees 7.

Lineup

Source:

2010 roster

Season standings

Record vs. opponents

Detailed record

Game log 

|-  style="text-align:center; background:#bfb;"
| 1 || April 4 || Yankees || 9–7 ||  Okajima (1–0) ||  Park (0–1) ||  Papelbon (1) || 37,440 || 1–0 || 
|-  style="text-align:center; background:#fbb;"
| 2 || April 6 || Yankees || 4–6 ||  Aceves (1–0) ||  Okajima (1–1) ||  Rivera (1) || 38,000 || 1–1 || 
|-  style="text-align:center; background:#fbb;"
| 3 || April 7 || Yankees || 1–3 (10) || Park (1–1) || Papelbon (0–1) ||  Rivera (2) || 38,238 || 1–2 || 
|-  style="text-align:center; background:#fbb;"
| 4 || April 9 || @ Royals || 3–4 ||  Parrish (1–0) || Bard (0–1) ||  Soria (1) || 21,091 || 1–3 || 
|-  style="text-align:center; background:#bfb;"
| 5 || April 10 || @ Royals || 3–8 || Beckett (1–0) || Greinke (0–1) ||  || 37,505 || 2–3 || 
|-  style="text-align:center; background:#bfb;"
| 6 || April 11 || @ Royals || 6–8 || Buchholz (1–0) || Meche (0–1) || Papelbon (2) || 19,240 || 3–3 || 
|-  style="text-align:center; background:#fbb;"
| 7 || April 12 || @ Twins || 2–5 || Pavano (2–0) || Lester (0–1) || Rauch (5) || 38,145 || 3–4 || 
|-  style="text-align:center; background:#bfb;"
| 8 || April 14 || @ Twins || 6–3 || Lackey (1–0) || Slowey (1–1) || Papelbon (3) || 38,164 || 4–4 || 
|-  style="text-align:center; background:#fbb;"
| 9 || April 15 || @ Twins || 0–8 || Liriano (1–0) || Wakefield (0–1) || || 38,341 || 4–5 || 
|-  style="text-align:center; background:#fbb;"
| 10 || April 16¹ || Rays || 1–3 (12) || Cormier (2–0) || Delcarmen (0–1) || Soriano (3) || 37,084 || 4–6 || 
|-  style="text-align:center; background:#fbb;"
| 11 || April 17 || Rays || 5–6 || Shields (1–0) || Buchholz (1–1) || Soriano (4) || 37,022 || 4–7 || 
|-  style="text-align:center; background:#fbb;"
| 12 || April 18 || Rays || 1–7 || Garza (3–0) || Lester (0–2) ||  || 37,143 || 4–8 || 
|-  style="text-align:center; background:#fbb;"
| 13 || April 19 || Rays || 2–8 || Niemann (1–0) || Lackey (1–1) ||  || 37,609 || 4–9 || 
|-  style="text-align:center; background:#bfb;"
| 14 || April 20 || Rangers || 7–6 || Papelbon (1–1) || Franscisco (2–3) ||  || 37,614 || 5–9 || 
|-  style="text-align:center; background:#bfb;"
| 15 || April 21 || Rangers || 8–7 (12) || Okajima (2–1) || Nippert (2–0) ||  || 37,518 || 6–9 || 
|-  style="text-align:center; background:#fbb;"
| 16 || April 22 || Rangers || 0–3 || Wilson (1–1) || Buchholz (1–2) || Oliver (1) || 37,417 || 6–10 || 
|-  style="text-align:center; background:#bfb;"
| 17 || April 23 || Orioles || 4–3 || Delcarmen (1–1) || Albers (0–2) ||  Papelbon (4) || 37,367 || 7–10 || 
|-  style="text-align:center; background:#bfb;"
| 18 || April 24 || Orioles || 7–6 || Lackey (2–1) || Albers (0–3) || Papelbon (5) || 38,017 || 8–10 || 
|-  style="text-align:center; background:#fbb;"
| 19 || April 25 || Orioles || 6–7 (10) || Johnson (0–1) || Atchinson (0–1) || Meredith (1) || 37,102 || 8–11 || 
|-  style="text-align:center; background:#bfb;"
| 20 || April 26 || @ Blue Jays || 13–12 || Schoeneweis (1–0) || Camp (1–1) || Papelbon (6) || 13,847 || 9–11 || 
|-  style="text-align:center; background:#bfb;"
| 21 || April 27 || @ Blue Jays || 2–1|| Buchholz (2–2) || Downs (0–3) || R. S. Ramírez (1) || 14,776 || 10–11 || 
|-  style="text-align:center; background:#bfb;"
| 22 || April 28 || @ Blue Jays || 2–0 || Lester (1–2) || Cecil (1–1) || Papelbon (6) || 15,276 || 11–11 || 
|-  style="text-align:center; background:#fbb;"
| 23 || April 30 || @ Orioles || 4–5 (10) || Albers (1–3) || R. S. Ramírez (0–1) ||   || 30,668 || 11–12 || 
|-
| colspan=10| ¹: match suspended by rain at 1–1 in the ninth inning. Continuation and end of the game April 17.
|-

|-  style="text-align:center; background:#fbb;"
| 24 || May 1 || @ Orioles || 9–12 || Bergesen (1–2) || Matsuzaka (0–1) || Simón (2) || 35,164 || 11–13 || 
|-  style="text-align:center; background:#fbb;"
| 25 || May 2 || @ Orioles || 2–3 (10) || Albers (2–3) || Papelbon (1–2) ||  || 34,255 || 11–14 || 
|-  style="text-align:center; background:#bfb;"
| 26 || May 3 || Angels || 17–8 || Buchholz (3–2) || Saunders (1–5) ||  || 37,404 || 12–14 || 
|-  style="text-align:center; background:#bfb;"
| 27 || May 4 || Angels || 5–1 || Lester (2–2) || Jepsen (0–1) ||  || 37,411 || 13–14 || 
|-  style="text-align:center; background:#bfb;"
| 28 || May 5 || Angels || 3–1 || Lackey (3–1) || Piñeiro (2–4) || Papelbon (8) || 37,601 || 14–14 || 
|-  style="text-align:center; background:#bfb;"
| 29 || May 6 || Angels || 11–6 || Matsuzaka (1–1) || Kazmir (2–2) ||   || 37,639 || 15–14 || 
|-  style="text-align:center; background:#fbb;"
| 30 || May 7 || Yankees || 3–10 || Hughes (4–0) || Beckett (1–1) ||   || 37,898 || 15–15 || 
|-  style="text-align:center; background:#fbb;"
| 31 || May 8 || Yankees || 3–14 || Aceves (3–0) || Buchholz (3–3) ||   || 37,138 || 15–16 || 
|-  style="text-align:center; background:#bfb;"
| 32 || May 9 || Yankees || 9–3 || Lester (3–2) || Burnett (4–1) ||  || 37,618 || 16–16 || 
|-  style="text-align:center; background:#bfb;"
| 33 || May 10 || Blue Jays || 7–6 || Lackey (4–1) || Morrow (2–3) || Papelbon (9) || 37,332 || 17–16 || 
|-  style="text-align:center; background:#bfb;"
| 34 || May 11 || Blue Jays || 6–1 || Matsuzaka (2–1) || Eveland (3–2) ||  || 37,609 || 18–16 || 
|-  style="text-align:center; background:#fbb;"
| 35 || May 12 || Blue Jays || 2–3 || Marcum (2–1) || Wakefield (0–2) || Gregg (10) || 37,198 || 18–17 || 
|-  style="text-align:center; background:#bfb;"
| 36 || May 14 || @ Tigers || 7–2 || Buchholz (4–3) || Scherzer (1–4) ||  || 31,732 || 19–17 || 
|-  style="text-align:center; background:#fbb;"
| 37 || May 15 || @ Tigers || 6–7 (12) || Valverde (1–1) || Delcarmen (1–2) ||   || 40,742 || 19–18 || 
|-  style="text-align:center; background:#fbb;"
| 38 || May 16 || @ Tigers || 1–5 || Galarraga (1–0) || Lackey (4–2) ||  || 35,454 || 19–19 || 
|-  style="text-align:center; background:#fbb;"
| 39 || May 17 || @ Yankees || 9–11 || Vázquez (2–4) || Papelbon (1–3) ||   || 48,271 || 19–20 || 
|-  style="text-align:center; background:#bfb;"
| 40 || May 18 || @ Yankees || 7–6 || Bard (1–1) || Rivera (0–1) || Papelbon (10) || 47,734 || 20–20 || 
|-  style="text-align:center; background:#bfb;"
| 41 || May 19 || Twins || 3–2 || Buchholz (5–3) || Baker (4–4) || Bard (1) || 37,426 || 21–20 || 
|-  style="text-align:center; background:#bfb;"
| 42 || May 20 || Twins || 6–2 || Lester (4–2) || Liriano (4–3) ||  || 38,144 || 22–20 || 
|-  style="text-align:center; background:#fbb;"
| 43 || May 21 || @ Phillies || 1–5 || Hamels (5–2) || Lackey (4–3) || Romero (2) || 45,341 || 22–21 || 
|-  style="text-align:center; background:#bfb;"
| 44 || May 22 || @ Phillies || 5–0 || Matsuzaka (3–1) || Kendrick (2–2) ||   || 45,310 || 23–21 || 
|-  style="text-align:center; background:#bfb;"
| 45 || May 23 || @ Phillies || 8–3 || Wakefield (1–2) || Halladay (6–3) ||   || 45,068 || 24–21  ||
|-  style="text-align:center; background:#bfb;"
| 46 || May 24 || @ Rays || 6–1 || Buchholz (6–3) || Davis (4–4) ||   || 21,430 || 25–21 || 
|-  style="text-align:center; background:#bfb;"
| 47 || May 25 || @ Rays || 2–0 || Lester (5–2) || Shields (5–2) || Papelbon (11) || 24,310 || 26–21 || 
|-  style="text-align:center; background:#bfb;"
| 48 || May 26 || @ Rays || 11–3 || Lackey (5–3) || Garza (5–3) ||   || 22,147 || 27–21 || 
|-  style="text-align:center; background:#fbb;"
| 49 || May 27 || Royals || 3–4 || Bannister (4–3) || Matsuzaka (3–2) || Soria (1) || 37,940 || 27–22 || 
|-  style="text-align:center; background:#fbb;"
| 50 || May 28 || Royals || 5–12||Davies (4–3)   ||Wakefield (1–3)  ||   ||37,945  || 27–23 ||
|-  style="text-align:center; background:#bfb;"
| 51 || May 29 || Royals || 1–0 || Buchholz (7–3) || Greinke (1–6) || Papelbon (12) || 37,956 || 28–23 || 
|-  style="text-align:center; background:#bfb;"
| 52 || May 30 || Royals || 8–1 || Lester (6–2) || Thompson (0–4) ||  || 37,581 || 29–23 || 
|-

|-  style="text-align:center; background:#bfb;"
| 53 || June 1 || Athletics || 9–4 || Lackey (6–3) || Ross (1–4) ||   || 37,337 || 30–23 || 
|-  style="text-align:center; background:#bfb;"
| 54 || June 2 || Athletics || 6–4 || Matsuzaka (4–2) || Sheets (2–4) || Papelbon (13) || 37,783 || 31–23 || 
|-  style="text-align:center; background:#fbb;"
| 55 || June 3 || Athletics || 8–9 || Mazzaro (1–0)  || Wakefield (1–4)  || Bailey (12)  || 37,386 || 31–24 || 
|-  style="text-align:center; background:#bfb;"
| 56 || June 4 || @ Orioles || 11–0 || Buchholz (8–3) || Tillman (0–1) ||   || 30,070 || 32–24 || 
|-  style="text-align:center; background:#bfb;"
| 57 || June 5 || @ Orioles || 8–2 || Lester (7–2) || Guthrie (3–6) ||   || 40,001 || 33–24 || 
|-  style="text-align:center; background:#fbb;"
| 58 || June 6 || @ Orioles || 3–4 (11) || Hernandez (2–5) || Okajima (2–2) ||   || 27,774 || 33–25 || 
|-  style="text-align:center; background:#bfb;"
| 59 || June 7 || @ Indians || 4–1 || Matsuzaka (5–2) || Carmona (4–5) ||   || 14,758 || 34–25 || 
|-  style="text-align:center; background:#bfb;"
| 60 || June 8 || @ Indians || 3–2 || Wakefield (2–4) || Huff (2–7) || Bard (2) || 15,462 || 35–25 || 
|-  style="text-align:center; background:#fbb;"
| 61 || June 9 || @ Indians || 0–11 || Masterson (2–5) || Buchholz (8–4) ||   || 14,022 || 35–26 || 
|-  style="text-align:center; background:#fbb;"
| 62 || June 10 || @ Indians || 7–8 || Wood (1–2) || Bard (1–2) ||  || 20,446 || 35–27 || 
|-  style="text-align:center; background:#bfb;"
| 63 || June 11 || Phillies || 12–2 || Lackey (7–3) || Moyer (6–6) ||   || 38,021 || 36–27 || 
|-  style="text-align:center; background:#bfb;"
| 64 || June 12 || Phillies || 10–2 || Delcarmen (2–2) || Blanton (1–5) ||   || 37,061 || 37–27 || 
|-  style="text-align:center; background:#fbb;"
| 65 || June 13 || Phillies || 3–5 || Hamels (6–5) || Wakefield (2–5) || Lidge (4) || 37,230 || 37–28 || 
|-  style="text-align:center; background:#bfb;"
| 66 || June 15 || Diamondbacks || 6–3 || Buchholz (9–4) || Kennedy (3–4) || Papelbon (14) || 37,459 || 38–28 || 
|-  style="text-align:center; background:#bfb;"
| 67 || June 16 || Diamondbacks || 6–2 || Lester (8–2) || Lopez (2–6) || Papelbon (15) || 37,542 || 39–28 || 
|-  style="text-align:center; background:#bfb;"
| 68 || June 17 || Diamondbacks || 8–5 || Lackey (8–3) || Haren (7–5) ||   || 37,544 || 40–28 || 
|-  style="text-align:center; background:#bfb;"
| 69 || June 18 || Dodgers || 10–6 || Doubront (1–0) || Monasterios (3–2) || Bard (3) || 37,723 || 41–28 || 
|-  style="text-align:center; background:#bfb;"
| 70 || June 19 || Dodgers || 5–4 || Papelbon (2–3) || Belisario (1–1) ||   || 37,454 || 42–28 || 
|-  style="text-align:center; background:#bfb;"
| 71 || June 20 || Dodgers || 2–0 || Buchholz (10–4) || Kuroda (6–5) || Papelbon (16) || 37,430 || 43–28 || 
|-  style="text-align:center; background:#fbb;"
| 72 || June 22 || @ Rockies || 1–2 || Chacín (4–6) || Lester (8–3) || Belisle (1) || 48,112 || 43–29 || 
|-  style="text-align:center; background:#fbb;"
| 73 || June 23 || @ Rockies || 6–8 || Corpas (2–4) || Papelbon (2–4) ||   || 48,243 || 43–30 || 
|-  style="text-align:center; background:#bfb;"
| 74 || June 24 || @ Rockies || 13–11 (10)  || Papelbon (3–4) || Street (0–1) ||   || 48,582 || 44–30 || 
|-  style="text-align:center; background:#fbb;"
| 75 || June 25 || @ Giants || 4–5 || Sánchez (6–5) || Wakefield (2–6) || Wilson (21) || 41,182 || 44–31 || 
|-  style="text-align:center; background:#bfb;"
| 76 || June 26 || @ Giants || 4–2 || Atchinson (1–1) || Bumgarner (0–1) || Papelbon (17) || 42,178 || 45–31 || 
|-  style="text-align:center; background:#bfb;"
| 77 || June 27 || @ Giants || 5–1 || Lester (9–3) || Lincecum (8–3) ||  || 41,528 || 46–31 || 
|-  style="text-align:center; background:#bfb;"
| 78 || June 29 || Rays || 8–5 || Lackey (9–3) || Shields (6–8) || Papelbon (18) || 38,013 || 47–31 || 
|-  style="text-align:center; background:#fbb;"
| 79 || June 30 || Rays || 4–9 || Garza (9–5) || Matsuzaka (5–3) ||   || 38,055 || 47–32 || 
|-

|-  style="text-align:center; background:#bfb;"
| 80 || July 2 || Orioles || 3–2 || Wakefield (3–6) || Bergesen (3–5) || Papelbon (19) || 38,067 || 48–32 || 
|-  style="text-align:center; background:#bfb;"
| 81 || July 3 || Orioles || 9–3 || Lester (10–3) || Guthrie (3–10) ||  || 38,106 || 49–32 || 
|-  style="text-align:center; background:#fbb;"
| 82 || July 4 || Orioles || 1–6 || Matusz (3–9) || Lackey (9–4) ||   || 37,742 || 49–33 || 
|-  style="text-align:center; background:#fbb;"
| 83 || July 5 || @ Rays || 5–6 || Choate (2–2) || R. S. Ramírez (0–2) || Soriano (22) || 28,528 || 49–34 || 
|-  style="text-align:center; background:#fbb;"
| 84 || July 6 || @ Rays || 2–3 || Niemann (7–2) || Doubront (1–1) || Soriano (23) || 19,902 || 49–35 || 
|-  style="text-align:center; background:#fbb;"
| 85 || July 7 || @ Rays || 4–6 || Price (12–4) || Wakefield (3–7) || Garza (1) || 24,356 || 49–36 || 
|-  style="text-align:center; background:#bfb;"
| 86 || July 9 || @ Blue Jays || 14–3 || Lester (11–3) || Romero (6–6) ||   || 27,567 || 50–36 || 
|-  style="text-align:center; background:#fbb;"
| 87 || July 10 || @ Blue Jays || 5–9 || Camp (3–1) || Lackey (9–5) || Gregg (20) || 35,037 || 50–37 || 
|-  style="text-align:center; background:#bfb;"
| 88 || July 11 || @ Blue Jays || 3–2 || Matsuzaka (6–3) || Litsch (0–4) || Papelbon (20) || 26,062 || 51–37 || 
|-  style="text-align:center; background:#bbcaff;"
| colspan="10"|All-Star Break: NL def. AL  at Angel Stadium of Anaheim, 3–1
|-  style="text-align:center; background:#fbb;"
| 89 || July 15 || Rangers || 2–7 || Hunter (6–0) || Wakefield (3–8) ||   || 38,062 || 51–38 || 
|-  style="text-align:center; background:#fbb;"
| 90 || July 16 || Rangers || 4–8 || Lewis (9–5) || Doubront (1–2) ||   || 37,669 || 51–39 || 
|-  style="text-align:center; background:#bfb;"
| 91 || July 17 || Rangers || 3–2 (11) || Delcarmen (3–2) || Ogando (3–1) ||   || 37,744 || 52–39 || 
|-  style="text-align:center; background:#fbb;"
| 92 || July 18 || Rangers || 2–4 || Wilson (8–5) || Lester (11–4) || Feliz (24) || 37,431 || 52–40 || 
|-  style="text-align:center; background:#bfb;"
| 93 || July 19 || @ Athletics ||2–1 || Matsuzaka (7–3) || Sheets (4–9) || Papelbon (21) || 19,341 || 53–40 || 
|-  style="text-align:center; background:#fbb;"
| 94 || July 20 || @ Athletics || 4–5 (10) || Bailey (1–3) || R. S. Ramírez (0–3) ||   || 20,271 || 53–41 || 
|-  style="text-align:center; background:#fbb;"
| 95 || July 21 || @ Athletics || 4–6 || Gonzalez (9–6) || Buchholz (10–5) || Wuertz (2) || 30,456 || 53–42 || 
|-  style="text-align:center; background:#bfb;"
| 96 || July 22 || @ Mariners || 8–6 (13) || Okajima (3–2) || Olson (0–3) || R. S. Ramírez (2) || 28,074 || 54–42 || 
|-  style="text-align:center; background:#bfb;"
| 97 || July 23 || @ Mariners || 2–1 || Atchinson (2–1) || Vargas (6–5) || Papelbon (22) || 34,932 || 55–42 || 
|-  style="text-align:center; background:#fbb;"
| 98 || July 24 || @ Mariners || 1–5 || Seddon (1–0) || Lester (11–5) || Olson (1) || 43,694 || 55–43 || 
|-  style="text-align:center; background:#fbb;"
| 99 || July 25 || @ Mariners || 2–4 || League (8–6) || Okajima (3–3) || Aardsma (18)  || 40,001 || 55–44 || 
|-  style="text-align:center; background:#bfb;"
| 100 || July 26 || @ Angels || 6–3 || Buchholz (11–5) || Haren (7–9)  || Papelbon (23) || 40,364 || 56–44 || 
|-  style="text-align:center; background:#bfb;"
| 101 || July 27 || @ Angels || 4–2 || Lackey (10–5) || Weaver (9–7) || Papelbon (24) || 40,120 || 57–44 || 
|-  style="text-align:center; background:#bfb;"
| 102 || July 28 || @ Angels || 7–3 || Beckett (2–1) || Rodney (4–1) ||   || 44,052 || 58–44 || 
|-  style="text-align:center; background:#fbb;"
| 103 || July 30 || Tigers || 5–6 || Weinhardt (1–1)  || Lester (11–6) ||   || 37,832 || 58–45 || 
|-  style="text-align:center; background:#bfb;"
| 104 || July 31 || Tigers || 5–4 || Okajima (4–3) || Coke (6–2) ||   || 37,498 || 59–45 || 
|-

|-  style="text-align:center; background:#bfb;"
| 105 || August 1 || Tigers || 4–3 || Papelbon (4–4) || Thomas (4–1) ||   || 37,479 || 60–45 || 
|-  style="text-align:center; background:#fbb;"
| 106 || August 2 || Indians || 5–6 || Carmona (11–8) || Lackey (10–6) || Perez (13) || 37,931 || 60–46 || 
|-  style="text-align:center; background:#bfb;"
| 107 || August 3 || Indians || 3–1 || Beckett (3–1) || Huff (2–10) || Papelbon (25) || 37,714 || 61–46 || 
|-  style="text-align:center; background:#fbb;"
| 108 || August 4 || Indians || 1–9 || Masterson (4–10) || Lester (11–7) ||   || 37,902 || 61–47 || 
|-  style="text-align:center; background:#bfb;"
| 109 || August 5 || Indians || 6–2 || Matsuzaka (8–3) || Tomlin (1–1) || Papelbon (26) || 38,102 || 62–47 || 
|-  style="text-align:center; background:#bfb;"
| 110 || August 6 || @ Yankees || 6–3 || Buchholz (12–5) || Vázquez (9–8) || Papelbon (27) || 49,555 || 63–47 || 
|-  style="text-align:center; background:#fbb;"
| 111 || August 7 || @ Yankees || 2–5 || Sabathia (14–5) || Lackey (10–7) || Rivera (23) || 49,716 || 63–48 || 
|-  style="text-align:center; background:#fbb;"
| 112 || August 8 || @ Yankees || 2–7 || Moseley (2–1) || Beckett (3–2) ||   || 49,096 || 63–49 || 
|-  style="text-align:center; background:#bfb;"
| 113 || August 9 || @ Yankees || 2–1 || Lester (12–7) || Hughes (13–5) || Papelbon (28) || 49,476 || 64–49 || 
|-  style="text-align:center; background:#bfb;"
| 114 || August 10 || @ Blue Jays || 7–5 || Doubront (2–2) || Camp (3–2) || Papelbon (29) || 27,690 || 65–49 || 
|-  style="text-align:center; background:#bfb;"
| 115 || August 11 || @ Blue Jays || 10–1 || Buchholz (13–5) || Marcum (10–6) ||   || 28,308 || 66–49 || 
|-  style="text-align:center; background:#fbb;"
| 116 || August 12 || @ Blue Jays || 5–6 || Gregg (1–4) || Papelbon (4–5) ||   || 36,271 || 66–50 || 
|-  style="text-align:center; background:#fbb;"
| 117 || August 13 || @ Rangers || 9–10 || O'Day (4–2) || Wakefield (3–9) ||   || 47,195 || 66–51 || 
|-  style="text-align:center; background:#bfb;"
| 118 || August 14 || @ Rangers || 3–1 || Lester (13–7) || Lewis (9–9) || Doubront (1) || 48,030 || 67–51 || 
|-  style="text-align:center; background:#fbb;"
| 119 || August 15 || @ Rangers || 3–7 || Wilson (11–5) || Matsuzaka (8–4) ||   || 30,252 || 67–52 || 
|-  style="text-align:center; background:#bfb;"
| 120 || August 17 || Angels || 6–0 || Buchholz (14–5) || Weaver (11–8) ||   || 38,304 || 68–52 || 
|-  style="text-align:center; background:#bfb;"
| 121 || August 18 || Angels || 7–5 || Lackey (11–7) || Jepsen (2–3) || Papelbon (30) || 37,779 || 69–52 || 
|-  style="text-align:center; background:#fbb;"
| 122 || August 19 || Angels || 2–7 || Santana (13–8) || Beckett (3–3) ||   || 37,641 || 69–53 || 
|-  style="text-align:center; background:#fbb;"
| 123 || August 20 || Blue Jays || 2–16 || Cecil (10–6) || Lester (13–8) ||   || 37,726 || 69–54 || 
|-  style="text-align:center; background:#bfb;"
| 124 || August 21 || Blue Jays || 5–4 (11) || Papelbon (5–5) || Janssen (4–2) ||   || 37,614 || 70–54 || 
|-  style="text-align:center; background:#bfb;"
| 125 || August 22 || Blue Jays || 5–0 || Buchholz (15–5) || Marcum (11–7) || Doubront (2) || 37,506 || 71–54 || 
|-  style="text-align:center; background:#bfb;"
| 126 || August 23 || Mariners || 6–3 || Lackey (12–7) ||  Fister (4–9) || Papelbon (31) || 37,133 || 72–54 || 
|-  style="text-align:center; background:#bbb;"
| || August 24 || Mariners  || colspan=7 |Postponed: rain
|-  style="text-align:center; background:#bfb;"
| 127 || August 25 || Mariners || 5–3 || Beckett (4–3) || Pauley (2–5) || Papelbon (32) || 37,183 || 73–54 || 
|-  style="text-align:center; background:#fbb;"
| 128 || August 25 || Mariners || 2–4 || Hernández (10–10) || Wakefield (3–10) || League (4) || 37,451 || 73–55 || 
|-  style="text-align:center; background:#bfb;"
| 129 || August 27 || @ Rays || 3–1 || Lester (14–8) || Price (15–6) || Papelbon (33) || 29,461 || 74–55 || 
|-  style="text-align:center; background:#fbb;"
| 130 || August 28 || @ Rays || 2–3 (10) || Choate (4–3) || Atchinson (2–2) ||  || 36,973 || 74–56 || 
|-  style="text-align:center; background:#fbb;"
| 131 || August 29 || @ Rays || 3–5 || Shields (13–11) || Lackey (12–8) || Soriano (39) || 23,438 || 74–57 || 
|-  style="text-align:center; background:#fbb;"
| 132 || August 31 || @ Orioles || 2–5 || Matusz (7–12) || Beckett (4–4) || Uehara (5) || 18,247 || 74–58 || 
|-

|-  style="text-align:center; background:#bfb;"
| 133 || September 1 || @ Orioles || 9–6 || Lester (15–8) || Hendrickson (1–5) || Papelbon (34) || 16,210 || 75–58 || 
|-  style="text-align:center; background:#bfb;"
| 134 || September 2 || @ Orioles || 6–4 || Matsuzaka (9–4) || Bergesen (6–10) || Papelbon (35) || 26,954 || 76–58 || 
|-  style="text-align:center; background:#bbb;"
| || September 3 || White Sox || colspan=7 |Postponed: rain
|-  style="text-align:center; background:#fbb;"
| 135 || September 4 || White Sox || 1–3 || Danks (13–9) || Buchholz (15–6) || Jenks (26) || 37,411 || 76–59 || 
|-  style="text-align:center; background:#fbb;"
| 136 || September 4 || White Sox || 1–3 || Floyd (10–11) || Lackey (12–9) || Jenks (27) || 37,858 || 76–60 || 
|-  style="text-align:center; background:#fbb;"
| 137 || September 5 || White Sox || 5–7 || Linebrink (3–1) || Papelbon (5–6) || Thornton (6) || 37,570 || 76–61 || 
|-  style="text-align:center; background:#bfb;"
| 138 || September 6 || Rays || 12–5 || Lester (16–8) || Niemann (10–6) ||   || 37,546 || 77–61 || 
|-  style="text-align:center; background:#fbb;"
| 139 || September 7 || Rays || 5–14 || Price (17–6) || Matsuzaka (9–5) ||   || 37,290 || 77–62 || 
|-  style="text-align:center; background:#bfb;"
| 140 || September 8 || Rays || 11–5 || Wakefield (4–10) || Garza (14–8) ||   || 37,757 || 78–62 || 
|-  style="text-align:center; background:#fbb;"
| 141 || September 10 || @ Athletics || 0–5 || Cahill (16–6) || Buchholz (15–7) ||   || 19,139 || 78–63 || 
|-  style="text-align:center; background:#fbb;"
| 142 || September 11 || @ Athletics || 3–4 || Anderson (5–6) || Lackey (12–10) || Bailey (23) || 22,932 || 78–64 || 
|-  style="text-align:center; background:#bfb;"
| 143 || September 12 || @ Athletics || 5–3 || Beckett (5–4) || Braden (9–12) || Papelbon (36) || 19,806 || 79–64 || 
|-  style="text-align:center; background:#bfb;"
| 144 || September 13 || @ Mariners || 5–1 || Lester (17–8)  || Fister (5–12) ||   || 19,063 || 80–64 || 
|-  style="text-align:center; background:#bfb;"
| 145 || September 14 || @ Mariners || 9–6 || Hill (1–0) || League (9–7) ||   || 18,381 || 81–64 || 
|-  style="text-align:center; background:#bfb;"
| 146 || September 15 || @ Mariners || 5–1 || Buchholz (16–7)  || Pauley (2–8)  ||   || 21,936 || 82–64 || 
|-  style="text-align:center; background:#fbb;"
| 147 || September 17 || Blue Jays || 9–11 || Cecil (13–7) || Lackey (12–11) || Gregg (32) || 37,679 || 82–65 || 
|-  style="text-align:center; background:#fbb;"
| 148 || September 18 || Blue Jays || 3–4 || Romero (13–9) || Beckett (5–5) || Gregg (33) || 37,863 || 82–66 || 
|-  style="text-align:center; background:#bfb;"
| 149 || September 19 || Blue Jays || 6–0 || Lester (18–8) || Marcum (12–8) ||   || 37,234 || 83–66 || 
|-  style="text-align:center; background:#fbb;"
| 150 || September 20 || Orioles || 2–4 || Hernandez (8–8) || Matsuzaka (9–5) || Uehara (10) || 37,560 || 83–67 || 
|-  style="text-align:center; background:#fbb;"
| 151 || September 21 || Orioles || 1–9 || Bergesen (8–10) || Atchinson (2–3) ||   || 37,464 || 83–68 || 
|-  style="text-align:center; background:#bfb;"
| 152 || September 22 || Orioles || 6–1 || Lackey (13–11) || Millwood (3–16) ||   || 37,729 || 84–68 || 
|-  style="text-align:center; background:#bfb;"
| 153 || September 24 || @ Yankees || 10–8 || Beckett (6–5) || Pettitte (11–3)  || Papelbon (37) || 49,457 || 85–68 || 
|-  style="text-align:center; background:#bfb;"
| 154 || September 25 || @ Yankees || 7–3 || Lester (19–8) || Nova (1–1)  ||   || 49,558 || 86–68 || 
|-  style="text-align:center; background:#fbb;"
| 155 || September 26 || @ Yankees || 3–4 (10) || Logan (2–0) || Okajima (4–4) ||   || 49,199 || 86–69 || 
|-  style="text-align:center; background:#bfb;"
| 156 || September 27 || @ White Sox || 6–1 || Buchholz (17–7) || Buehrle (12–13) ||   || 19,750 || 87–69 || 
|-  style="text-align:center; background:#fbb;"
| 157 || September 28 || @ White Sox || 4–5 || Sale (2–1) || Bowden (0–1) ||  || 16,982 || 87–70 || 
|-  style="text-align:center; background:#fbb;"
| 158 || September 29 || @ White Sox || 2–5 || García (12–6) || Beckett (6–6) || Thornton (8) || 32,084 || 87–71 || 
|-  style="text-align:center; background:#fbb;"
| 159 || September 30 || @ White Sox || 2–8 || Danks (15–11) || Lester (19–9) ||   || 30,854 || 87–72 || 
|-

|-  style="text-align:center; background:#bbb;"
| 160 || October 1 || Yankees || colspan=7 |Postponed: rain
|-  style="text-align:center; background:#fbb;"
| 160 || October 2 || Yankees || 5–6 (10) || Hughes (18–8) || Papelbon (5–7) ||  || 37,467 || 87–73 || 
|-  style="text-align:center; background:#bfb;"
| 161 || October 2 || Yankees || 7–6 (10) || Manuel (1–0) || Nova (1–2) ||  || 37,589 || 88–73 || 
|-  style="text-align:center; background:#bfb;"
| 162 || October 3 || Yankees || 8–4 || Lackey (14–11) || Moseley (4–4) ||  || 37,453 || 89–73 || 
|-

Players stats

Batting
Note: G = Games played; AB = At bats; R = Runs scored; H = Hits; 2B = Doubles; 3B = Triples; HR = Home runs; RBI = Runs batted in; BB = Bases on balls; SO = Strikeouts; SB = Stolen bases; AVG = Batting average

Pitchers batting

 Source: « Boston Red Sox batting stats »

Pitching
Note: W = Wins; L = Losses; ERA = Earned run average; G = Games pitched; GS = Games started; SV=Saves; SVO = Save Opportunities; IP = Innings pitched; H = Hits allowed; R = Runs allowed; ER = Earned runs allowed; HR= Home runs allowed; BB = Walks allowed;  SO = Strikeouts 

 Source: « Boston Red Sox pitching stats »

Awards and honors 
 Adrián Beltré – Silver Slugger Award (3B)
 Clay Buchholz – AL Pitcher of the Month (August)
 Jon Lester – AL Pitcher of the Month (May)
 David Ortiz – AL Player of the Month (May)

All-Star Game
 Adrián Beltré, reserve 3B
 Clay Buchholz, reserve P
 Jon Lester, reserve P
 Víctor Martínez, reserve C
 David Ortiz, reserve DH
 Dustin Pedroia, reserve 2B

Farm system

Source:

References

External links

 2010 Boston Red Sox season at Baseball Reference
 2010 Boston Red Sox season official site
 2010 Boston Red Sox Draft Selections

Boston Red Sox seasons
Boston Red Sox
Boston Red Sox
Red Sox